XHMXS-FM is a community radio station licensed to serve the communities of Sicuicho, Cherato, Cheratillo and 18 de Marzo, all located in Los Reyes, Michoacán. XHMXS broadcasts on 104.5 FM and is owned by La Mexicanita Sapichu, A.C.

History
XHMXS received its social community concession on September 26, 2016. The station had previously operated as a pirate on 88.9 MHz.

References

Radio stations in Michoacán
Community radio stations in Mexico
Former pirate radio stations
Radio stations established in 2016